Rampasasa pygmies is a name given to a group of families described as pygmoid or Negrito,  native to  Waemulu village in Kecamatan Wae Rii, Manggarai Regency, Flores, Indonesia, following the discovery of  Homo floresiensis in the nearby Liang Bua cave in 2003.

The Rampasasa have since been reported as claiming Homo floresiensis as their ancestor and as "cashing in on hobbit craze".

A genetic study published in 2018 discounted the possibility of the Rampasasa descending from H. floresiensis, concluding that "multiple independent instances of hominin insular dwarfism occurred on Flores". However, as no genetic material from H. floresiensis was included in the analyses, any truly definitive conclusions cannot be made.

References

Goldenberg, Linda (2007). Little People and a Lost World: An Anthropological Mystery, 90f.

External links

Negritos
Ethnic groups in Indonesia
Flores Island (Indonesia)